This was the first edition of the tournament.

Beatriz Haddad Maia and Kristina Mladenovic won the title, defeating Oksana Kalashnikova and Miyu Kato in the final, 5–7, 6–4, [10–4].

Seeds

Draw

Draw

External Links
Main Draw

2022 WTA 125 tournaments